Liang Xin (born 7 March 1975) is a Chinese basketball player. She competed in the women's tournament at the 1996 Summer Olympics.

References

1975 births
Living people
Chinese women's basketball players
Olympic basketball players of China
Basketball players at the 1996 Summer Olympics
Sportspeople from Beijing
Chinese expatriate basketball people
Chinese expatriate sportspeople in South Korea
Expatriate basketball people in South Korea
Beijing Great Wall players
Asian Games medalists in basketball
Asian Games bronze medalists for China
Basketball players at the 1994 Asian Games
Medalists at the 1994 Asian Games
20th-century Chinese women